Xanthaciura connexionis is a species of tephritid or fruit flies in the genus Xanthaciura of the family Tephritidae.

Distribution
United States South to Costa Rica, Venezuela, West Indies, Hawaiian Islands.

References

Tephritinae
Insects described in 1934
Diptera of South America
Diptera of North America